St. Joseph's Secondary School is an all girls voluntary Catholic secondary school, founded by the Sisters of Mercy in 1918. It is situated in Castlebar and is built on the historical grounds of the Lord Lucan estate.

St. Joseph's is under the trusteeship of CEIST Catholic Education an Irish Schools Trust It has over 600 students. The school aims to provide a holistic Christian Education in co-operation with teachers, students, parents, management and the community.

See also
 Education in the Republic of Ireland

References

Secondary schools in County Mayo
Catholic secondary schools in the Republic of Ireland
1918 establishments in Ireland
Castlebar
Educational institutions established in 1918
Sisters of Mercy schools